Basim, Basem or Bassem (Arabic: بَاسِم ) is a common Arabic name meaning "one who smiles". A more accurate proper spelling in English is Basim, as there is no stress (Shadda) on the "s" syllable in the Arabic original. The name stem from the Arabic verb basama (Arabic: َبَسَم) meaning "to smile". 

Notable people with the name include:
Bassem Alayleh (Born some day in 2000s), moron

Bassem Amin (born 1988), Egyptian chess player
Bassem Awadallah (born 1964), Jordanian public figure
Bassem Balaa (born 1981), Lebanese basketball player 
Bassem Ben Nasser (born 1982), Tunisian footballer
Bassem Boulaâbi (born 1984), Tunisian footballer
Bassem Breish, Lebanese film director and writer
Bassem Eid (born 1958), Palestinian human rights activist
Bassem Feghali (born 1978), Lebanese comedian and drag queen
Bassem Hamad al-Dawiri (?–2007), Iraqi sculptor and artist
Bassem Hassan Mohammed (born 1987), Qatari equestrian
Bassem Marmar (born 1977), Lebanese football player and manager
Bassem Ouda (born 1970), Egyptian politician
Bassem Sabry (1982–2014), Egyptian journalist and civil rights campaigner
Bassem Srarfi (born 1997), Tunisian footballer
Bassem al-Tamimi (born 1967), Palestinian activist
Bassem Yakhour (born 1971), Syrian actor, writer and director
Bassem Youssef, Egyptian political satirist
Bassem Youssef (FBI agent), Egyptian-American law enforcement official

See also
Bassam (disambiguation)
Basim (disambiguation)